A wallaby is the informal name for any of about thirty species of Australian marsupials.

Wallaby or Wallabies may also refer to:

 Wallaby, Japanese fantasy manga
 Sopwith Wallaby, British single-engined biplane 
 The Wallabies, nickname of the Australia national rugby union team
 Wallabee, line of shoes manufactured by C. & J. Clark
 The Wallaby ULM aeroplane by Fly Synthesis 
 Adobe Wallaby from Adobe is a Flash-to-HTML5 Conversion Tool 
 A semantic configuration service for the Condor High-Throughput Computing System, developed by Red Hat
 Wallaby (ferry), a ferry that operated on Sydney Harbour from 1879. 
The WALLABY (Widefield ASKAP L-Band Legacy All-Sky Blind Survey) astronomical survey with the ASKAP telescope